Manuel "Lito" Mercado Lapid (born October 25, 1955) is a Filipino actor and politician serving as a Senator since 2019, and previously from 2004 to 2016. He started his political career in Pampanga, serving as vice governor from 1992 to 1995, and governor from 1995 to 2004.

In 2015, he was charged for graft over his alleged involvement in the 2004 Fertilizer Fund scam while he was governor of Pampanga, but the case was dismissed in 2016 by the Sandiganbayan anti-graft court due to the "inordinate delay" in the investigation.

Early life and education
Lapid was born in Porac, Pampanga on October 25, 1955. He is the fifth child out of nine children of Jose Songco Lapid and Eleuteria Mercado. He completed his elementary education at the Porac Central School in 1968 and secondary education at St. Catherine's Academy in Porac in 1972. He did not enroll for his tertiary education as he pursued acting.

Acting career
Lapid entered the film industry as a stuntman, and became an actor. He is the nephew of Jess Lapid and the cousin of Jess Lapid Jr. The movie "The Jess Lapid Story" got him noticed in the movie industry.

Political career
In the 1992 general election he ran under the opposition block Nationalist People's Coalition as vice governor of Pampanga, and defeated the incumbent vice governor Cielo Macapagal-Salgado.

In 1995, he ran for governor of Pampanga under the same party against Governor Bren Guiao, who had the support of former President Corazon Aquino, and won. When he sought a second term in 1998, Lapid joined the administration party Lakas-NUCD. After the impeachment of President Joseph Estrada in 2000 and the second EDSA Revolution the following year, he ran again for his final term and won.

He decided to run as mayor of Angeles City, in the 2004 elections but abandoned his plans when he was encouraged to run as a senator.

Senate
During the 2004 Senatorial elections, the then-president Gloria Macapagal Arroyo encouraged Lapid to run as a senator under the administration coalition K4. He accepted the offer and won the election where he placed eleventh. During his first term, he ran for mayor of Makati in 2007, but lost to incumbent Mayor Jejomar Binay; thus, he kept his Senate seat.

In May 2010, he was re-elected as senator, placing 11th in the overall ranking. He ran under the Lakas–CMD but subsequently left the party in 2012 and served until 2016 as an independent. He was chairman of the Senate Committee on Tourism and Cooperatives. As he was ineligible to seek another re-election to the Senate, Lapid ran for mayor of Angeles City in 2016, but lost to incumbent Mayor Edgardo Pamintuan.

Lapid sought for a comeback to the Senate in 2019 and won, placing 7th overall. He earned his third nonconsecutive term.

Personal life

Lapid is married to Marissa Tadeo, with whom he has four children including Mark. Lapid also has a child with former supermodel Melanie Marquez and another, actress Ysabel Ortega with former singer, Michelle Ortega.

Filmography

Film

Television

References

External links

Senate of the Philippines - Lito Lapid

1955 births
Living people
ABS-CBN personalities
Filipino actor-politicians
Filipino film directors
Filipino male film actors
GMA Network personalities
Governors of Pampanga
Kapampangan people
Lakas–CMD politicians
Male actors from Pampanga
Members of the Pampanga Provincial Board
Nationalist People's Coalition politicians
People from Makati
Senators of the 13th Congress of the Philippines
Senators of the 14th Congress of the Philippines
Senators of the 15th Congress of the Philippines
Senators of the 16th Congress of the Philippines
Senators of the 18th Congress of the Philippines
Senators of the 19th Congress of the Philippines